Expulsion from Spain may refer to:

Expulsion of Jews from Spain (1492 in Aragon and Castile, 1497–98 in Navarre)
Expulsion of the Moriscos (1609–1614)

See also
Forced conversions of Muslims in Spain (1500–1502 in Castile, 1515–16 in Navarre and 1523–1526 in Aragon)